The Campaign for New York's Future is a coalition of civic, business, environmental, labor, community and public health organizations that supports the goals and strategic direction of New York City Mayor Michael Bloomberg’s sustainability proposal, PlaNYC 2030.

Members

 600 Grand Block Association
 AARP
 American Cancer Society
 American Institute of Architects, New York Chapter
 American Lung Association of the City of New York
 American Lung Association of New York State
 American Planning Association
 Atlantic Avenue Betterment Association
 Better Hood Pacific Street Block Association
 Bryant Park Corporation
 Building and Construction Trades Council of Greater New York
 Building Trades Employers Association
 Chinese Chamber of Commerce of New York
 Citizens Committee for New York City
 Council on the Environment NYC (CENYC)
 Crow Hill Community Association
 Design Trust for Public Space
 District Council 9, Painters
 District Council 1707, AFSCME
 Drum Major Institute
 Environmental Defense
 General Contractors Association
 Gowanus Stakeholders Group
 Hispanic Federation
 Iron Hills Civic Association
 Latin American Chaplains Association
 Lin Sing Association
 Long Island Progressive Coalition
 Mason Tenders District Council
 Metropolitan Waterfront Alliance
 Midland Beach Civic Association
 Morningside Heights Coalition
 Natural Resources Defense Council
 Neighbors Advocating for Good Growth (NAG)
 New Partners for Community Revitalization
 New York AREA
 New York Building Congress
 New York City District Council of Carpenters
 New York City Healthy Schools Network
 New York Hispanic Chamber of Commerce
 New York Industrial Retention Network
 New York  League of Conservation Voters
 New York Urban Land Institute District Council
 North Brooklyn Alliance
 North Brooklyn Development Corp.
 Nos Quedamos
 NYC Apollo Alliance
 NYC Central Labor Council
 Pacific 400 Block Association
 Partnership for New York City
 Pratt Center for Community Development
 Project for Public Spaces
 Prospect Place 300 Association
 Regional Plan Association
 Rev. Anne Grant- Triumphant New Destiny
 Rev. Carlyle Thorbs- Baptist Ministers Conference
 Rev. Cecil Henry- Calvary Community Church
 Rev. Eddie Okyere- Miracle Church of Christ
 Rev. Gregory Roberson Smith- Mother Zion AME
 Rev. Les Mullings- Church of Nazarene
 Rev. Luc Gurrier- Sanctified Church of God
 Rev. Robert Lowe- Mt. Moriah AME Church
 Rev. Timothy Mitchell- Antioch Baptist Church
 Riverkeeper
 Scenic Hudson
 SEIU 32BJ
 Soho Alliance
 South Beach Civic Association
 Straphangers Campaign, NYPIRG
 Teamsters, Joint Council 16
 The New York City Environmental Justice Alliance
 Transport Workers Union Local 100
 Transportation Alternatives
 Tri-State Transportation Campaign
 Trust for Public Land
 Urban Agenda
 UPROSE
 Vision Long Island
 WE ACT for Environmental Justice
 Western Jackson Heights Alliance
 Women’s City Club
 Youth Ministries for Peace and Justice Peace and Justice

See also
 Congestion Pricing
 New York congestion pricing

External links
 Campaign for New York's Future
 Mayor Michael Bloomberg's homepage

Urban planning in New York City
Organizations based in New York City